Santhal may refer to :

Places and jurisdictions 
 Santhal Pargana division, in Jharkhand state, (north)eastern India
 Santhal State, former petty princely state in Mahi Kantha, Gujarat, western India

People 
 Santhal people (part of the Tea Tribes), in Jharkhand, West Bengal, Bihar, Odisha, Assam in India, also minorities in neighboring Bangladesh and Nepal 
 their Santhal rebellion in present-day Jharkhand, India 
 Jangal Santhal, co-founder of the Naxalite movement